The County of Sicily, also known as County of Sicily and Calabria, was a Norman state comprising the islands of Sicily and Malta and part of Calabria from 1071 until 1130. The county began to form during the Christian reconquest of Sicily (1061–91) from the Muslim Emirate, established by conquest in 965. The county is thus a transitional period in the history of Sicily. After the Muslims had been defeated and either forced out or incorporated into the Norman military, a further period of transition took place for the county and the Sicilians.

History

The County of Sicily was created by Robert Guiscard in 1071 for his younger brother Roger Bosso. Guiscard himself had received the title Duke of Sicily (dux Siciliae) in 1059 from Pope Nicholas II as encouragement to conquer it from the Muslims. In 1061 the first permanent Norman conquest (Messina) was made and in 1071, after the fall of Palermo, the capital of the emirate and future capital of the county, Guiscard invested Roger with the title of count and gave him full jurisdiction in the island save for half the city of Palermo, Messina, and the Val Demone, which he retained for himself. Roger was to hold the county which comprised conquests yet to be made under Guiscard. In February 1091 the conquest of Sicily was completed when Noto fell. The conquest of Malta was begun later that year; it was completed in 1127 when the Arab administration of the island was expelled.

Robert Guiscard left Roger in an ambiguous relationship with his successors of the Duchy of Apulia and Calabria. After the death of Robert in 1085, Roger I obtained from the new duke, Roger Borsa, the whole rights over the castles in Calabria, the lordship of which he had previously shared with Robert Guiscard. In fact, the seat of Roger I's government was the Calabrian town of Mileto. According to historians Agostino Inveges and Matteo Camera, Roger I started to use the title "Great Count of Sicily and Calabria" since 1096. After the death of Roger I the major change was the transfer of the capital: Palermo became the capital in 1112, when Roger II was invested with the county, after the regency of the mother Adelaide del Vasto. With this change, Sicily come to be governed by the central government, while the Calabrian territories became a provincial administrative unit. During the reigns of Roger II of Sicily and William II of Apulia conflict broke out between the two Norman principalities, first cousins through Roger and Robert respectively. Through the mediation of Pope Calistus II and in return for aid against a rebellion led by Jordan of Ariano in 1121, the childless William ceded all his Sicilian territories to Roger and named him his heir.

When William died in 1127, Roger inherited the mainland duchy; three years later, in 1130 in Palermo, he merged his holdings to form the Kingdom of Sicily with the approval of antipope Anacletus II.

List of counts

Sicily was granted, pending its Christian reconquest, to Robert Guiscard as "duke" in 1059 by Pope Nicholas II. Guiscard granted it as a county to his brother Roger.

See also
 Kingdom of Sicily
 Kingdom of Africa
 Norman-Arab-Byzantine culture

References 

1130 disestablishments in Europe
12th-century disestablishments in Italy
States and territories established in 1071
Former countries in Europe
County of Sicily
1071 establishments in Europe
11th-century establishments in Italy
Norman conquest of southern Italy